Waurá (Wauja) is an Arawakan language spoken in the Xingu Indigenous Park of Brazil by the Waujá people. It is "partially intelligible" with Mehináku. The entire population speaks the language.

Phonology

Consonants 

 A glottal stop [ʔ] occurs phonetically before vowels in word-initial position, or after vowels in word-final position.
 /p/ can be heard as aspirated [pʰ] or voiced [b] in free variation.
 Stop sounds /t, k/ can be heard as aspirated [tʰ, kʰ] in free variation.
 /w/ can also be heard as [β] in free variation, except when before /u/.
 /s/ can be heard as voiced [z] when between vowels, or after initial vowels.
 /ʐ/ can be heard as voiceless [ʂ] when between vowels, or after initial vowels.
 /j/ can be heard as a palatal nasal [ɲ] when occurring before nasal vowels /ã, ẽ, ũ/.

Vowels 

 Sounds /i, u, ɨ, a/ can also be heard in lax form as [ɪ, ʊ, ə, ɐ].
 Sounds /e, eː, ẽ/ can be heard as close-mid [e, eː, ẽ] or open-mid [ɛ, ɛː, ɛ̃] in free variation.

References

Arawakan languages
Languages of Xingu Indigenous Park